Swami Vivekananda on Himself is a biographical book on Swami Vivekananda written in an autobiographical manner. This book was published in 1963 by Swami Sambudhdhananda, general secretary of Swami Vivekananda's birth centenary committee. In this book, the life and different incidents of Swami Vivekananda's life have been written here in his own words.

Composition

This book is probably the first approach to write a biography of Swami Vivekananda. It is like an autobiographical (first-person narrative). The book is In the first edition (1963). According to the publishers  - this book is a documentation of selected notes and utterances of Swami Vivekananda about himself and his works collected from different books. Publishers have used excerpts from these books:
The Complete Works of Swami Vivekananda - 8 volumes
The Gospel of Sri Ramakrishna
Sri Ramakrishna: The Great Master
The Master as I Saw Him
The Life of Swami Vivekananda by His Eastern and Western Disciples
New Discoveries: Swami Vivekananda in America
After the first publication in 1963, the book has been reprinted and republished multiple times

See also
Swami Vivekananda

References

Indian biographies
1963 non-fiction books
Swami Vivekananda
20th-century Indian books